Thurcroft Welfare F.C. was an English association football club based in Thurcroft, Rotherham, South Yorkshire.

History 
The club was formed in the 1930s as Thurcroft Main and played in local Sheffield leagues. It won the Sheffield Association League title in 1943. They also won the Sheffield & Hallamshire Senior Cup (1947) and Wharncliffe Charity Cup (1955), as well as entering the FA Amateur Cup as Thurcroft Welfare.

League and cup history

Honours

League 
 Sheffield Association League
 Champions: 1942–43

Cup 
 Sheffield & Hallamshire Senior Cup
 Winners: 1946–47
 Wharncliffe Charity Cup
 Winners: 1954–55

Records 
 Best FA Amateur Cup performance: 2nd Qualifying Round, 1958–59

References 

Defunct football clubs in England
Defunct football clubs in South Yorkshire
Sheffield Association League
Sheffield Amateur League
Mining association football teams in England